The 2022 Hollywood Casino 400 was a NASCAR Cup Series race held on September 11, 2022, at Kansas Speedway in Kansas City, Kansas. Contested over 267 laps on the  intermediate speedway, it was the 28th race of the 2022 NASCAR Cup Series season, second race of the Playoffs, and the second race of the Round of 16.

Report

Background

Kansas Speedway is a  tri-oval race track in Kansas City, Kansas. It was built in 2001 and it currently hosts two annual NASCAR race weekends. The IndyCar Series also raced at here until 2011. The speedway is owned and operated by the International Speedway Corporation.

Entry list
 (R) denotes rookie driver.
 (i) denotes driver who is ineligible for series driver points.

Practice

Practice results

Qualifying

Qualifying results

Race

Stage Results

Stage One
Laps: 80

Stage Two
Laps: 85

Final Stage Results

Stage Three
Laps: 102

Race statistics
 Lead changes: 16 among 12 different drivers
 Cautions/Laps: 9 for 43
 Red flags: 0
 Time of race: 3 hours, 10 minutes and 3 seconds
 Average speed:

Media

Television
USA covered the race on the television side. Rick Allen, Jeff Burton, Steve Letarte and Dale Earnhardt Jr. called the race from the broadcast booth. Dave Burns, Kim Coon and Parker Kligerman handled the pit road duties from pit lane.

Radio
MRN had the radio call for the race, which was also simulcast on Sirius XM NASCAR Radio. Alex Hayden, Jeff Striegle and Todd Gordon called the race for MRN when the field raced thru the front straightaway. Dave Moody called the race for MRN from Turns 1 & 2, and Mike Bagley called the race for MRN from turns 3 & 4. Steve Post, Jason Toy & Brienne Pedigo covered the action for MRN from pit lane.

Standings after the race

Drivers' Championship standings

Christopher Bell (No. 20 Joe Gibbs Racing) has advanced on points in the driver's and owner's championship.   The No. 45 23XI Racing team has advanced with the team win in the owner's championship.

Manufacturers' Championship standings

Note: Only the first 16 positions are included for the driver standings.

References

2022 in sports in Kansas
Hollywood Casino 400
NASCAR races at Kansas Speedway
Hollywood Casino 400